Ramayana: The Legend of Prince Rama is a 1992 anime film co-produced by Japan and India and produced and directed by Yugo Sako and based on the Indian epic the Ramayana. The film was directed by Koichi Sasaki and Ram Mohan, with music composed by Vanraj Bhatia. Although it was banned in India during the Babri Masjid riots, it was later dubbed in Hindi and aired on DD National.

Premise 
Ayodhya king Dasharatha is forced by his third wife Kaikeyi to exile prince Rama for 14 years, where Rama, along with his brother Lakshmana and wife Sita departs from Ayodhya, and starts a new life in the forest until Ravana, the demon king of Lanka kidnaps Sita in order to destroy Rama. Learning this, Rama and Lakshmana sets out to rescue Sita with the help of Hanuman and Sugreeva, the king of Kishkindha who leads an army of monkeys called Vanara.

Voice cast

English 
 Nikhil Kapoor – Rama
 Rael Padmasee – Sita
 Uday Mathan – Ravana
 Mishal Varma – Lakshmana
 Noel Godin – Hanuman
 Bulbul Mukherjee – Dasharatha
 Madhulika Varma – Kaikeyi
 Rahul Bose – Bharata
 Pearl Padamsee – Manthara
 Bhargava Krishna – Kumbhakarna
 Shagufta Jaffrey – Surpanakha
 Easo Vivin Mathew – Indrajit
 Denzil Smith – Sugreeva
 Cyrus Broacha – Angada
 Dodo Bhujwala – Additional Voices
 Rohan Arthur – Additional Voices
 Avi Shroff – Additional Voices
 Akash Sharma S - Additional Voices
 Salome Parikh – Additional Voices
 Farid Saboonchi – Additional Voices
 Leeya Mehta – Additional Voices

Hindi Dubbed 
 Shatrughan Sinha – Narrator
 Arun Govil – Rama
 Namrata Sawhney – Sita
 Shakti Singh – Lakshmana
 Adarsh Gautam – Bharata
 Dilip Sinha – Hanuman
 Amrish Puri – Ravana
 Harjeet Walia – Dasharatha
 Sava- Kaikeyi
 Manju Bhatia- Manthara
 Rakesh Vidua- Jatayu
 Umesh Sharma – Jambavan
 Raj Joshi – Sugreeva
 Pradeep Shukla – Kumbhakarna

Production 
In 1983, while working on "The Ramayana Relics" a documentary film about excavations by Dr. B. B. Lal near Allahabad in Uttar Pradesh (India) Yugo Sako came to know about the story of Ramayana. He liked the story of the Ramayana so much that he researched deeper into the topic and went on to read 10 versions of the Ramayana in Japanese. After reading the Ramayana he wanted to adapt it into animation as he didn't think a live-action movie could capture the true essence of Ramayana, "Because Ram is God, I felt it was best to depict him in animation, rather than by an actor." TEM Co., Ltd. financed the production and a new production studio Nippon Ramayana Film Co., Ltd. was set up  and the principal animation of the film began in 1990 with 450 artists on board. Indian animators guided their Japanese teammates with Indian customs and traditions depicted in the film like how dhotis are worn and how the children receive blessings from their elders.

Controversies 
The Indian Express misinterpreted Yugo Sako's "The Ramayana Relics" documentary and published that he was making a new Ramayana. Soon thereafter, a protest letter based on the misunderstanding from the Vishva Hindu Parishad was received by the Japanese Embassy in Delhi, which said that no foreigners could arbitrarily cinematize Ramayana because it was the great national heritage of India. After the misconceptions were cleared, Yugo Sako proposed the idea of an animated Ramayana to the VHP and the government. He told them that animation was a serious art form in Japan and it would help bring the Ramayana to a wider global audience. The Government agreed initially, but later declined his proposal for a bi-nation collaboration, saying the Ramayana is a very sensitive subject and cannot be portrayed as a cartoon. Also, the fact that the movie was being made at the height of the Ayodhya dispute, added to the controversy and axed the prospects of producing it in India. With no choice and support left, the movie was ultimately produced in Japan with nearly 450 artists from both nations contributing to its creation.

Music 

There are different songs for the Original English Version (sung in Sanskrit) and the Hindi Dub version (sung in Hindi), both are listed below. The lyrics are written by Vasant Dev (Sanskrit) and P.K. Mishra (Hindi).

English Version Soundtrack (Sanskrit)

Hindi Version Soundtrack (Hindi)

Release 
The original English version with Sanskrit songs was worked on by teams from both countries and was screened for the first time at 24th International Film Festival of India, New Delhi, January 10–20, 1993. The film was also shown at the 1993 Vancouver International Film Festival.

The Hindi dub version was released in the late 1990s. Arun Govil, who is popularly known for playing the role of Rama in Ramayan (1987 TV series) voiced Prince Rama in the version. This film was distributed as a work in the 40th Anniversary of the Establishment of the Diplomatic Relations between Japan and India. The film was not released on a large scale as the Ram Janmabhoomi (Birthplace) Movement was at its peak and the movie made into controversy. But later it was released on TV channel Cartoon Network.

It was released in the United States as Warrior Prince or The Prince of Light: The Legend of Ramayana by Krishna Shah, further localized English dub with narration by James Earl Jones, prince Rama voiced by Bryan Cranston and additional music by Alan Howarth. That version was released on November 9, 2001.

It was the opening film of the 2000 Lucca Animation Film Festival in Italy, a highlight of the Cardiff Animation Film Festival in the United Kingdom and won Best Animation Film of the Year at the 2000 Santa Clarita International Film Festival in the United States.

2022 was an important year for both countries as they marked  70 years of India-Japan relations. On the occasion of 70th Anniversary Year, the remaster of this film would be launched during the 5th edition of Japanese Film Festival in India, along with 10 other films.

The specific 2022 edition of the original film is called the Anniversary Edition, which is a 4K Remaster version of the original film with stereo audio and better graphics and visuals as tech use in the original film is old. This is also the first time that this anime movie would be released theatrically, following with releases in DVDs, Blu-rays and OTT platforms.

Reception 
When it was screened at the Vancouver International Film Festival, festival director Alan Franey called the film "Extraordinary", and said "The backgrounds are done in beautiful detail, while the foreground characters are an Indian version of the Disney style, with big dewey eyes."

The film won "Best Animation Film of the Year" award at the Santa Clarita International Family Film Festival. In 2001, Academy of Motion Picture Arts & Sciences announced a new category, Academy Award for Best Animated Feature. Ramayana was one of nine films that qualified to be nominated.

Ken Eisner writing in Variety in 1993 was critical of the film, saying the film is "Relentlessly paced, pic has no heart" and it is "and is not even great to look at". Robert Koehler reviewed the film again in 2001 for Variety, also giving it a critical review. He described the film as "A curious fusion of an interesting if simplified literary adaptation with emphatically second-rate animation technique" and said "the blatantly American vocal casting and direction are painfully out of kilter with the 5,000-year-old Indian setting".

References

External links 

 
 Official Website of "The Prince of Light" – Archive.org (The site was closed in 2009.)
 Yugo Sako's Ramayan Odyssey at Beliefnet
 
 
 
 Prince of Light at Academy Of Motion Picture Arts And Sciences database

1990s adventure drama films
1993 anime films
1993 drama films
1993 films
Animated adventure films
Animated drama films
Animated films based on Ramayana
Animated romance films
Anime in India
Japanese fantasy adventure films
Films set in ancient India
Films set in the Middle Ages
Hindu mythological films
Indian animated speculative fiction films
Indian epic films
Japanese animated fantasy films
1990s English-language films